Chimarud castle is a historical castle located in Rudbar County in Gilan Province, The longevity of this fortress dates back to the Nizari Ismaili state.

References 

Castles in Iran
Castles of the Nizari Ismaili state